Jon Ray Gilliam (October 22, 1938 – July 2, 2020) was an American college and professional football center who played seven seasons in the American Football League from 1962-1968. He played for the 1962 AFL Champion Dallas Texans (in their last season before relocating to Kansas City as the Kansas City Chiefs) and the 1966 AFL Champion Kansas City Chiefs, who went on to face the NFL Champion Green Bay Packers in the first AFL-NFL World Championship Game, Super Bowl I.

In his rookie season, he was selected for the AFL All-Star Game squad as a linebacker.

He died on July 2, 2020, in Granbury, Texas at age 81.

See also
Other American Football League players

References

1938 births
2020 deaths
Sportspeople from Oklahoma City
Players of American football from Oklahoma
American football centers
Texas A&M–Commerce Lions football players
Dallas Texans (AFL) players
Kansas City Chiefs players
American Football League players
American Football League All-Star players